Río Naranjo is a district of the Bagaces canton, in the Guanacaste province of Costa Rica.

History 
Río Naranjo was created on 27 April 1995 by Decreto Ejecutivo 24286-G.

Geography 
Río Naranjo has an area of  km2 and an elevation of  metres.

Villages
The town of Río Naranjo is the administrative center of the district. The only other village is Río Chiquito.

Demographics 

For the 2011 census, Río Naranjo had a population of  inhabitants.

Transportation

Road transportation 
The district is covered by the following road routes:
 National Route 6

References 

Districts of Guanacaste Province
Populated places in Guanacaste Province